is a Japanese manga series written and illustrated by Moyoco Anno, serialized in the seinen magazine Morning since 2004. The story centers on 28-year-old Hiroko Matsukata, editor at the magazine . Talented and hard-working, Hiroko's colleagues refer to her as Hataraki Man (literally "working man") because of her dedication to her job. But despite her successes in the workplace, she struggles with moments of self-doubt and with the challenge of balancing life and career.

Hataraki Man was adapted into an anime television series broadcast from October to December 2006 and a drama that aired from October to December 2007. In North America, the anime series has been licensed by Maiden Japan.

Plot
Hiroko Matsukata is a woman who works for a magazine company. She puts all she has into her work, and is known as a strong, straightforward working girl, who can at will turn herself into Hataraki man (working man) mode. Despite Hiroko's success at work, her life lacks romance. Even though a hard worker, she would leave early anytime to go on a date. Too bad her boyfriend is an even bigger workaholic than Hiroko.

Development
Anno has said that "Absolutely, women need a Man Switch", saying that more understanding is needed of male and female psychology in the workplace.  She is critical of a "laziness" in modern Japanese culture, saying that "The traditional virtue of Japan was that people took everything very seriously. As those traditions have been eroded, the quality of Japanese work has been downgraded."

Characters

Played by: Miho Kanno
Hiroko is a woman dedicated to her job. She will put her entire life on hold (becoming the "Hataraki Man") in order to get her story written to a self-imposed, very high standard of perfection. Her ultimate goal is to own and publish her own magazine.

Played by: Michiko Kichise
Maiko is an elegant woman who is revered (and very nearly worshiped) by the men at JIDAI. She is typically very silent and somewhat aloof, but she does get her job done (even if she ignores more of the rules of etiquette of such things).

Played by: Yoshiyoshi Arakawa
Akihisa is a mild-mannered reporter in charge of the "food and porn" section of JIDAI. He and Hiroko started working at the magazine around the same time. There is a connection between, though whether this is from similar work ethic, starting their jobs at the same time, or the fact that they are drinking buddies (always initiated by Hiroko) is up for debate.

Played by: Aya Hirayama
Mayu's main goal in life is to write a work of fiction with her favorite author. She is a bit of a flake within the world of JIDAI and is often reprimanded for that fact. She is one of Hiroko's closest office friends.

Played by: Ikki Sawamura
Narita is the more active boss in the editing department, much to the dismay of the chief editor, Tatsuhiko (though he does not act offended but on occasion.) Narita is a man who knows when to be the boss and when to be the encouraging friend. While he is usually shown as being an amiable man who wants to help the other employees, he is not above yelling at the others to make sure they get their best work done and before deadline. It is never said explicitly one way or another where his sexual preference ultimately lies; but it is mentioned that Narita "doesn't like women".

Yumi, one of the four women actually seen working within JIDAI, is almost the complete opposite of Hiroko, if only in their approach to working within a "man's world". Yumi chose to embrace her "womanly" side instead of trying to run with the men. She is engaged to an unnamed man, though there are hints that her fiancé was the former boyfriend of coworker Maiko Kaji.

Played by: Kanji Tsuda
Sugawara is more a paparazzo than a traditional reporter. He hunts down high scandal stories and then stakes them out to get the perfect picture. Unexpectedly, he has an inner calm that is expressed through his pleasure of sky photography; however, to the outside world he is a gruff man with a bit of a mean streak.

Kunio is a man who feels that one's life should not be wasted completely on working. He gets his job done but, unlike Hiroko, he does not feel that one should devote their whole life to just work. While there are several people who clash with Hiroko throughout the series, Kunio is probably one of those that repeats the most, if only for their complete difference in work ethic.

Played by: Masato Ibu
As the senior editor within the department, Tatsuhiko does not seem to do a whole lot. He is a rather laid back man and is often accused of being sexist towards the female characters. While he is very susceptible to flattery, Tatsuhiko also has his serious moments. There is a reason why he is the boss and when the stakes are raised, he is willing to step up and take responsibility.

Played by: Hisashi Yoshizawa
Like Hiroko, Shinji works long hours. He also frequently travels on business, making it difficult for the two of them to spend time together. Shinji is not as successful in his business endeavors as Hiroko, however, and this leads to more problems in their relationship.

Media

Manga
Hataraki Man is written and illustrated by Moyoco Anno. The series started its serialization in Kodansha's seinen magazine Morning in 2004. The series has been on hiatus since March 2008, due to Anno's health.

Volume list

Anime

Drama
A drama adaptation aired from October to December 2007.

Reception

The realism of the series has been regarded as key to its popularity with readers facing the same issues in life.

References

External links
 

2004 manga
2006 anime television series debuts
2007 Japanese television series debuts
2007 Japanese television series endings
Japanese television dramas based on manga
Kodansha manga
Maiden Japan
Moyoco Anno
Nippon TV dramas
Noitamina
Seinen manga